Johnny Terence Hall (born 16 February 1991) is a Samoan association football player who plays primarily as a defender for Brookvale FC in the Manly-Warringah Premier League.

Club career
Hall grew up playing for Manly United since the age of nine. He currently plays for Brookvale FC

International career
On 31 August 2015, Hall made his senior international debut for Samoa in a 3–2 win against American Samoa, in the First round of OFC matches for 2018 FIFA World Cup qualification which doubles as qualification for the 2016 OFC Nations Cup.
On 4 September 2015, Hall scored his first senior international goal, followed by a second goal in Samoa's 3–0 victory over Tonga.

International goals
Scores and results list Samoa's goal tally first.

Personal life
Hall is the cousin of Brisbane Roar FC winger Jai Ingham.

References

External links

1991 births
Living people
People with acquired Samoan citizenship
Samoan footballers
Association football midfielders
Samoa international footballers
2016 OFC Nations Cup players
Soccer players from Sydney
Australian soccer players
Australian sportspeople of Samoan descent